Shadowrun: The Trading Card Game is an out-of-print collectible card game, released by FASA in August 1997 as a spin-off from FASA Corporation's Shadowrun role-playing game and used the same scenario, a cyberpunk setting with fantasy elements – an apocalyptic near-future Earth, with advanced technology (bio-engineering, robotics, virtual reality) which was also populated by magic and supernatural beings such as elves and dragons.

Each player assumes the role of a "shadowrunning" group, enlisting mercenaries with several different skills, and acquiring equipment, contacts, technology or mystical items to complete several types of missions. There are only two sets released for the game. The base set, simply titled Shadowrun, and one expansion, Underworld, which focuses on the criminals, such as Mafia and Yakuza, and the police that tried to bring them down. Despite its initial success and awards, no further expansions for the game were released.

A second printing of the base set, called Second Running replaced 39 cards and changed the art for 12 more. This printing also updated the text for clarity and clarified some rules. The Underworld set consisted of 141 cards sold in 15-card booster packs and was released in March 1998.

Reception
Shadowrun: The Trading Card Game won the 1997 Origins Awards in the categories "Best Trading Card Game of 1997" and "Best Graphic Presentation of a Card Game of 1997".

Reviews
Backstab No. 5

References

External links
 Boardgamegeek entry
 Description, some card images
 Preview of the game

Card games introduced in 1997
Collectible card games
Origins Award winners
Shadowrun